C. Lakshmi Rajyam or shortly Lakshmirajyam (1922–1987) was a South Indian film and drama actress and film producer in 1930s to 1970s.

She is a native of Owk. She learned music from her uncle Narasimham and Harikatha exposition from Saluri Rajeshwara Rao at a young age. She joined the drama company of Puvvula Suri Babu along with her uncle Venkata Ramaiah. She played Nalini in Tulabaram, Chitra in Chintamani plays and earned fame. Her contemporaries are Pulipati Venkateswarlu and Puvvula Ramatilakam.

She started her film career as a child artist in Sri Krishna Leelalu (1934) and later acted in about 35 films mostly of Telugu language. She became famous actress after playing the role of second heroine in Illalu (1940) directed by Gudavalli Ramabrahmam.

She married K. Sridhar Rao and established Rajyam Pictures in 1951. They produced about 11 films including Daasi (1952), Krishna Leelalu (1959), Harischandra (1960), Narthanasala (1963), Shakuntala (1966) and Govula Gopanna (1968), Rangeli Raja (1971)

Filmography
 Shri Krishna Leelalu (1935)  as   Radha
 Srikrishna Thulabhaaram (1935)
 Sasirekha Parinayam (1936)
 Amma (1939)
 Illalu (1940)
 Apavadu (1941)
 Panthulamma (1943)
 Mangalsutram (1946)
 Narada Naradi (1946)
 Tyagayya (1946)
 Drohi (1948) ... Seeta
 Paramanandayya Sishyulu (1950) ... Leelavathi
 Samsaram (1950) ... Manjula
 Agni Pareeksha (1951) ... Sushila
 Akasharaju (1951)
 Mayalamari (1951)
 Mayapilla (1951)
 Daasi (1952) (actor and producer)
 Praja Seva (1952)
 Velaikari Magal (1953) (actor and producer)
 Raju Peda (1954)
 Ettuku Pai Ettu (1958)
 Krishna Leelalu (1959) (actor and producer)
 Maragatham (1959)
 Harishchandra (1960) (actor and producer)
 Vimala (1960)
 Kongunattu Thangam (1961)
 Narthanasala (1963) (actor and producer)
 Iruvar Ullam (1963)
 Shakuntala (1966) (actor and producer)
 Govula Gopanna (1968)  (actor and producer)
 Rangeli Raja (1971) (actor and producer)
 Magaadu (1976) (producer)

References

External links
 
 
 Photograph of Lakshmirajyam with Indian Prime Minister.
 C. Lakshmi Rajyam vs Commissioner Of Income-Tax, ... on 21 March, 1960

1922 births
1987 deaths
20th-century Indian actresses
Telugu actresses
People from Kurnool district
Actresses from Andhra Pradesh
Indian women film producers
Film producers from Andhra Pradesh
Telugu film producers
Actresses in Telugu cinema
Indian film actresses
20th-century Indian businesspeople
Businesswomen from Andhra Pradesh
20th-century Indian businesswomen